A total of at least twenty-three special routes of U.S. Route 17 exist; two in Florida, five in South Carolina, fifteen in North Carolina, and six in Virginia.

Florida

Kissimmee truck route

US 17-92 Truck is an alternate route for US 17-92 in northern Kissimmee, Florida, following John Young Parkway and the Osceola Parkway (CR 522) instead of Vine Street (US 192) and Orange Blossom Trail. It was signed in about 2011 when the single-point urban interchange at John Young and Osceola Parkways was completed.

Until 1999, a truck bypass was signed around Downtown Kissimmee. It began where US 17-92 formerly turned from John Young Parkway onto West Emmett Street, and continued north in a straight line along John Young Parkway to US 192, where it turned east until it returned to US 17-92 at North Main Street (Orange Blossom Trail). The route existed from sometime during the 1980s until 1999, when US 17-92 itself was rerouted to bypass downtown Kissimmee.

Maitland truck route

US 17-92 Truck is designated to divert overheight truck traffic away from a low railroad bridge that carries the SunRail rail line over US 17-92 in southern Maitland. The route follows State Road 423 (Lee Road), Interstate 4, and State Road 414 (Maitland Boulevard) in Winter Park, Florida and Maitland. It formerly used Wymore Road and Lake Avenue (CR 438A) instead of I-4 and SR 414.

South Carolina

South Carolina alternate route

U.S. Route 17 Alternate is an alternate route of U.S. Route 17 in South Carolina that runs between Pocotaligo and Georgetown.

Yemassee connector route

U.S. Route 17 Connector (US 17 Conn.) is a connector route within the city limits of Yemassee. It connects Yemassee Highway with US 17 Alt./US 21 and to the eastern terminus of South Carolina Highway 68 (SC 68; Connelly Street). It is known as Flowers Street and is an unsigned highway.

Summerville alternate truck route

U.S. Route 17 Alternate Truck (US 17 Alt. Truck) is a  truck route of US 17 Alt. that is mostly within the city limits of Summerville. It uses South Carolina Highway 642 (SC 642) and SC 165.

Murrells Inlet–Garden City connector route

U.S. Route 17 Connector (US 17 Conn.) is a  connector route between US 17 and US 17 Business (US 17 Bus.) on the Murrells Inlet–Garden City line. It is unnamed and is an unsigned highway; the northbound side is signed as the business route instead.

Myrtle Beach business loop

U.S. Route 17 Business (US 17 Bus.), also known as Kings Highway, was established by 1967 when mainline US 17 was bypassed west of Murrells Inlet. In 1981, it was extended north to near Briarcliffe Acres, after mainline US 17 was placed on a new highway bypass route. The  business route connects: Murrells Inlet, Garden City, Surfside Beach, and Myrtle Beach. The highway is also a major route during the Bi-Lo Marathon weekend; miles 2-6 and also 19-21 run through this highway during the marathon.

North Carolina

Shallotte business loop

U.S. Route 17 Business (US 17 Bus) was established in 1991 after the completion of the Shallotte Bypass. The middle segment is also concurrent with NC 130, which splits from Business US 17 in the north to travel to Whiteville and splits in the south to travel to Holden Beach.

Bolivia business loop

U.S. Route 17 Business (US 17 Bus) was established in 1992 after the completion of the Bolivia Bypass.  The business route follows the old alignment of US 17 through Bolivia, the small county seat of Brunswick County.  This  route is also called the Old Ocean Highway and passes through the center of Bolivia near its northern terminus.

Wilmington business loop

U.S. Route 17 Business (US 17 Bus) is an  business route of US 17 through Wilmington, North Carolina. While physically running in a primarily east-west pattern, US 17 Business is signed as north-south, coherent with its parent route. Its southern terminus is located at an at-grade intersection between Third Street, Dawson Street, and the eastbound ramp of the Cape Fear Memorial Bridge which carries US 17, US 76, and US 421. US 17 Business continues north along Third Street through a residential area of downtown Wilmington. At Market Street, US 17 Business turns to the east, following the street out of downtown Wilmington. Leaving downtown Wilmington along Market Street, US 17 Business passes several historical sites including the Bellamy Mansion and First Baptist Church. Two pieces of artwork exist within the median of Market Street, including a monument to Cornelius Harnett at Fourth Street, and a fountain located within the intersection with Fifth Street. The George Davis Monument formerly stood in the median of Market Street at the Third Street intersection but was dismantled in 2020. The median along Market Street ends at 16th Street and US 17 Business passes through the Market Street Mansion District which is listed on the National Register of Historic Places. US 17 Business continues to travel through residential areas of Wilmington until intersecting Covil Avenue, where some commercial business are located adjacent to the highway. By Kerr Avenue, the adjacent properties are primarily commercial and retail businesses. US 17 Business meets US 117 and North Carolina Highway 132 (NC 132) at an partial cloverleaf interchange with College Road. US 17 Business continues along Market Street for  through a primarily commercial area of Wilmington until reaching its northern terminus at US 17.

US 17 Bus was established in 1971, two years after US 17 was realigned onto new routing; it traversed  along 3rd and Market Streets, between Dawson/Wooster and 16th/17th Streets. Market Street was part of the original alignment, but goes south instead of north along 3rd Street to meetup with US 17.  In 1979, AASHTO officially recognized US 17 Bus. In 2005, AASHTO approved the US 17 Bus extension upon completion of and realignment of US 17 along the Wilmington bypass.  On June 30, 2006, when the Wilmington bypass opened, US 17 Bus replaced segments of US 17:  North along Market Street, between 16th/17th Streets and near Futch Creek Road, and south crossing the Cape Fear Memorial Bridge to Eagle Island.  In May 2015, AASHTO approved a request to reroute US 17 back through Wilmington, following US 76 along Oleander Drive and Military Cutoff Road; the new alignment reduces the length of existing US 17 Bus to along 3rd Street and Market Street.  In May 2017, US 17 Bus was officially reduced as approved by AASHTO.

Major intersections

Jacksonville business loop

U.S. Route 17 Business (US 17 Bus) was established in 2006 after the completion of the Jacksonville Bypass, which rerouted US 17/NC 24 south and east around Jacksonville.  The old alignment along Wilmington Highway and Marine Boulevard became US 17 Bus, with a short  overlap with NC 24 Bus.

New Bern business loop

U.S. Route 17 Business (US 17 Bus) was established in 2000 as a renumbering of mainline US 17 through downtown New Bern, via Martin Luther King Jr. Boulevard, Neuse Boulevard, Broad Street, and Front Street.  In 2011, the business loop was extended south as mainline US 17 was placed on new freeway west of New Bern.

Vanceboro business loop

U.S. Route 17 Business (US 17 Bus) was established in 1961 when US 17 was rerouted, on bypass route, east of Vanceboro.  US 17 Bus travels along Main Street, sharing  of it with NC 43, since 1987.

Chocowinity–Washington business loop

U.S. Route 17 Business (US 17 Bus) was established in 2010 when US 17 was rerouted, onto the new freeway, bypassing east of Chocowinity and west of Washington. US 17 Bus follows the former section of US 17 through Chocowinity and along Bridge Street/Carolina Avenue in Washington.

Williamston business loop

U.S. Route 17 Business (US 17 Bus) was established in 1960 as a renumbering of US 17A, which traversed through downtown Williamston, via Washington Street and Main Street.  Between 1969-1977, US 17 Bus is split in the downtown area, northbound on Haughton Street and southbound on Elm Street.  In 2003, US 17 Bus was extended  that was formally US 17 when the new Williamston bypass was established.

Windsor bypass

Beginning at the US 13/US 17 split, located southeast of Windsor, US 17 Bypass follows the preexisting expressway grade of US 13. At exit 215, US 13 splits and continues north, while US 17 Bypass continues on freeway grade highway till it re-merges with US 17, near mile marker 221.

Edenton business loop

U.S. Route 17 Business (US 17 Bus) was established in 1977 as a renumbering of mainline US 17 through Edenton, via Queen Street and Broad Street.  In 1996 it was rerouted along Virginia Road to Broad Street and removed routing through the downtown area and along Queen Street, becoming SR 1204.  However, in 2012, NCDOT reversed course and reverted the business loop back to its original routing; thanks in part of not completing the formal route change package and distributing it (i.e. updating the TEAAS and road signs in the area).  NC 32 shares a concurrency along Broad Street, in the downtown area.

Hertford–Winfall business loop

U.S. Route 17 Business (US 17 Bus) was established in 1966 as a renumbering of mainline US 17 through Hertford (via Edenton Road Street, Dobbs Street and Church Street) and Winfall (via Creek Drive).  NC 37 shares a  concurrency from Winfall Boulevard to the Business loop's northern terminus.

Elizabeth City bypass

U.S. Route 17 Bypass (US 17 By-Pass) was established in 2004 and is a  controlled-access highway bypass west of Elizabeth City.  Unlike typical bypasses, a separate mainline US 17 continues along original 1953 bypass route (Hughes Boulevard), while a business route goes through downtown Elizabeth City.

Elizabeth City business loop

U.S. Route 17 Business (US 17 Bus) was established in 1960 as a renumbering of US 17A through downtown Elizabeth City, via Ehringhaus Street and Road Street.  The business loop has remained unchanged since its establishment.

Elizabeth City business truck route

U.S. Route 17 Business Truck is a unique truck route specifically for the US 17 Business loop in Elizabeth City.  Following US 158 west from the Camden Causeway and north along (mainline) US 17 to the junction with Business US 17.  The bypassed segment of US 17 Business not only has a weight limit precluding most trucks over two axles, but also passes through historic residential areas.

South Mills business loop

U.S. Route 17 Business (US 17 Bus) was established in September, 1984 as a renumbering of mainline US 17 through South Mills, via Main Street.  It is the northernmost US 17 Business in North Carolina.  West of South Mills, it joins with NC 343 and continues north, rejoining with  US 17.

Virginia

Chesapeake business loop

An old alignment of US Route 17 along the Dismal Swamp Canal carries the US Route 17 Business designation north from the Dominion Boulevard intersection to Deep Creek, where US 17 Business crosses the canal on a small drawbridge, before proceeding north to rejoin US Route 17 at Interstate 64 (Exit 296).

Gloucester Courthouse business loop

US Route 17 Business through Gloucester Courthouse consists of a  loop, Main Street, that travels through the historic courthouse district, intersecting State Routes 3 and 14. VA 14 multiplexes with US 17 Business on the northern leg back to US 17. Main Street is likely a former alignment of US Route 17, due to several US 17 shields on it that lack a Business banner.

Saluda business loop

U.S. Route 17 Business in Saluda branches off of mainline US 17 (Tidewater Trail) to the northeast at Gloucester Road along with a concurrency with Virginia State Route 33. One block after the wye Virginia Secondary Route 618 joins the two routes from the intersection of Lovers Retreat Lane. At the intersection of General Puller Highway VA 33 turns right SSR 618 continues north onto Oakes Landing Road and BUS US 17 turns left. This segment also contains the name "School Street," and runs west until reaching mainline US 17 once again.

Fredericksburg business loop

U.S. Business Route 17 through the vicinity of Fredericksburg, begins at the intersection of US 17 and Virginia State Route 2 southeast of Fredericksburg, where they both become Tidewater Trail. From there the road passes by Fredericksburg Country Club, Shannon Airport and the Fredericksburg Agricultural Fairgrounds. Within the city limits, Tidewater Trail becomes Dixon Street and crosses under the Blue and Gray Parkway interchange, then curves right before splitting onto southbound Princess Anne Street and northbound Caroline Street. Both streets cross under the Fredericksburg (VRE station), where US BUS 1 joins US BUS 17 along the same parallel one-way streets, until they reach Herndon Street and become a two-way street again at Princess Anne Street. US Bus 1 & 17 continues to run northwest until they reach US Route 1 where US BUS 1 terminates, but US BUS 17 joins and cross the Rappahannock River, and enters Falmouth. US BUS 17 leaves US 1 at the west end of Virginia State Route 218 where it runs northwest onto Warrenton Road before finally terminating at the north end of the I-95/US 17 multiplex at Exit 133-B.

Warrenton business loop

U.S. Business Route 17 in Warrenton, Virginia is also multiplexed with U.S. Business Route 15 and U.S. Business Route 29, at least at the southern end. After James Madison Highway becomes Shirley Avenue, US Bus 15 leaves this concurrency at Falmouth Street. U.S. Route 211 joins the two Business routes as US BUS Route 211 runs east along Waterloo Street and US 211-BUS 17/29 become Broadview Avenue. As the triplex curves right, and intersects Roebling Street, it becomes Lee Highway, and US Bus 17 makes a left turn onto Broadview Avenue, a name it will keep until the intersection of Foxcroft Road and becomes James Madison Highway before terminating at the interchange with mainline US Route 17.

Marshall business loop

U.S. Business Route 17 through the vicinity of Marshall, Virginia runs northeast from Exit 27 on Interstate 66, partially along Virginia State Route 55 (Free State Road, West Main Street), then turns southeast onto Winchester Road as it reunites with US 17 at Exit 28 on I-66.

Former Routes

Jacksonville alternate route

The Roosevelt Expressway is a spur of Interstate 10 (I-10; SR 8) west of downtown Jacksonville, in the U.S. state of Florida, built partially to freeway standards. It travels northeast from an intersection with Roosevelt Boulevard (U.S. Route 17 (US 17; SR 15), traveling parallel with nearby McDuff Avenue (SR 129), to a partial interchange with I-10.

The road is designated as a spur of SR 15, and was formerly numbered State Road 15A. It has also been – and may still be – an unsigned U.S. Route 17 Alternate (US 17 Alt.), which originally continued east on I-10 and north on I-95 to return to US 17 north of the Trout River.

Roosevelt Expressway is the bypass built as a spur of I-10, which converted US 17 into a limited-access Expressway north of Blanding Boulevard (SR 21), bypassing the Post Street/College Street route that Roosevelt Boulevard used to travel through the Riverside and Avondale historic district, passing by McDuff Avenue (SR 129) to I-10 eastbound.  The expressway is accessible southbound via I-10 west as a left exit (exit 361).

The current design was preferred over the proposed River Oaks Freeway, which would have decimated the Avondale district. The partial interchanges with Blanding and I-10 reflect the nature of the original need of a bypass system. Intended to stimulate commerce and encourage connectivity to Jacksonville's downtown to and from the suburbs and Orange Park, while streamlining commutes and lessening the impact such travel was to potentially have on Jacksonville's oldest areas in the southwest side of town by removing high volume and chaotic redevelopment from the streets of Avondale and Lakeside Park, the area east of the Roosevelt Expressway is now protected in the form of a zoning overlay largely allowed by the basic design of this alternate route.  Roosevelt Expressway has been signed in the last number of years as Roosevelt Boulevard, even though it's still in the JTA books as Expressway. It is part of the Blue Star Memorial Highway, and named for President Franklin D. Roosevelt.

In early 2006, the Florida Department of Transportation applied to the American Association of State Highway and Transportation Officials to reroute US 17 via the Roosevelt Expressway, I-10, I-95 and US 23. If this is accepted, US 17 Alt. will be eliminated. As of March 2007, it appears that US 17 has been rerouted. US 17 goes north on the Roosevelt Expressway, to east I-10 (SR 8), north on I-95, and east on Union Street (US 23) until Main Street and picking back up on its original course.

Savannah alternate route

U.S. Route 17 Alternate (US 17 Alt.) was an alternate route of US 17 that existed entirely within the city limits of Savannah. The roadway that would eventually become US 17 Alt. was established between November 1946 and February 1948 as SR 25 Spur, from US 17/SR 25 on the western edge of the city to US 17/US 80/SR 25/SR 26 in the main part. Between April 1949 and August 1950, it was then indicated to have started at US 17/SR 25 (Ogeechee Road), traveled east-southeast on 52nd Street, turned left on Whatley Avenue and traveled to the northeast, curved to the north-northeast onto Montgomery Street and traveled north-northeast to its northern terminus. By the beginning of 1952, US 17 Alt. was established on the path of SR 25 Spur from US 17/SR 25 east-southeast on Mills B. Lane Boulevard, northeast on Whatley Avenue, and north-northeast on Montgomery Street, as previously. In 1953, the path of US 17 Alt. on SR 25 Spur was redesignated as the northbound lanes of US 17.

Georgia–South Carolina alternate route

U.S. Route 17 Alternate (US 17 Alt.) was an alternate route of US 17 that existed in Savannah, Georgia and the southern part of South Carolina. It was concurrent with State Route 25 Alternate (SR 25 Alt.) for its entire length in Georgia. Between June 1954 and June 1955, US 17 Alt. and SR 25 Alt. were established from an intersection with the southbound lanes of US 17/SR 25 (Ogeechee Road), north-northeast on Stiles Avenue, right onto Gwinnett Street to the east-southeast, and left onto Boundary Street to the north-northeast. The highways reached the South Carolina state line, where SR 25 Alt. reached its northern terminus. US 17 Alt. crossed over the Savannah River on a toll bridge. It curved to the northwest and reached its northern terminus, another intersection with US 17. In 1985, US 17 Alt./SR 25 Alt. was rerouted to begin at an interchange with I-516/US 17/US 80/SR 21/SR 25/SR 26. It traveled east-southeast on Bay Street, turned right onto West Broad Street and traveled to the south-southwest, turned right onto York Street and traveled to the west-northwest, and turned right onto Boundary Street to continue as before. In 1991, the path of US 17 Alt./SR 25 Alt. was redesignated as SR 25 Conn.

This table shows the 1985-1991 intersections.

Mount Pleasant business loop

U.S. Route 17 Business in Mount Pleasant, South Carolina ran in an overlap with Bus US 701 along part of SC 703 and all of BS-526 from 1967 to 1992.

U.S. Route 17-1

U.S. Route 17-1 (US 17-1) was an original US highway, established in 1926; in North Carolina it was overlapped completely on NC 40.  It starts, in Wilmington, on 5th Street at Market Street (US 17/NC 20, where it goes north to Nixon Street, then east to McRae Street and proceeds north on Castle Haynes Road.  At Wallace, it follows today's NC 11 to Kenansville, then west, via today NC 24 Bus/NC 50, to Warsaw.  Continuing north, it goes through Faison, Mount Olive, and through Goldsboro on George Street.  Continuing north through Wilson, via Goldsboro Street and Herring Avenue, it connects Elm City, Rocky Mount, Battleboro, Halifax, and finally Weldon, via Washington Avenue and Sycamore Avenue.  Entering Virginia, it connects through Emporia before reaching Petersburg, via Sycamore Street, ending at Washington Street (US 1).

In 1932, the entire route was renumbered, with most of the Wilmington-Wilson route to US 117 and all of Wilson-Petersburg route to US 301.  Today, the entire route is paralleled with I-40 and I-95.

Wilmington truck route

This route used the one way pairs of Dawson and Wooster (from 16th St & 17th St to Oleander Drive.  Continuing East/North it then used Oleander Drive and Military Cutoff Road before rejoining then mainline US-17 at Market Street.  Mainline US-17 at the time used the Cape Fear Memorial Bridge, then split with Dawson and Wooster Streets until reaching 16th and 17th Streets.  Mainline US-17 then used 16th and 17th back to Market Street.  Once Mainline US-17 was moved to I-140 in 2005; the Truck route through Wilmington was deleted.

Williamston alternate route

Windsor alternate route

Elizabeth City alternate route

References

External links

17
17
17
17
17
U.S. Route 17
17